Kim Won-sik (born 21 January 1963) is a South Korean long-distance runner. He competed in the marathon at the 1984 Summer Olympics.

References

External links
 

1963 births
Living people
Athletes (track and field) at the 1984 Summer Olympics
South Korean male long-distance runners
South Korean male marathon runners
Olympic athletes of South Korea
Place of birth missing (living people)
Olympic male marathon runners
20th-century South Korean people